A boshiya (also called a bushiyyah or ghatwa) is a Middle Eastern, specifically Persian Gulf-style, full see through black veil which covers the wearer's face completely, with no openings for the eyes, and is traditionally worn with an abaya or other overgarment.

A boshiyyah or bushiyyah is essentially a large square of thin, cotton gauze material, with ties at the top, and is worn from the top of the forehead (either under or over the wearer's headscarf) and simply drapes down over the entire face, and, when flipped up, exposes the wearer's face in its entirety. A boshiyyah is normally not as opaque and covering as a traditional Niqab; they can also be worn to supplement a half-style Niqab or if the wearer desires extra modesty around non-related (non-mahram) men.

Sources 
 

Islamic female clothing
Veils